Packager may refer to:

Packager (manufacturing), encloses products for distribution, storage, sale, and use
Book packager, handles roles of book agent, editor, and publisher

See also
 Package (disambiguation)
 Pack (disambiguation)
 Software package (disambiguation)